Clifton Hill may mean:
Clifton Hill, Missouri, a town in USA
Clifton Hill, Victoria, a suburb of Melbourne, Australia
Clifton Hill, Niagara Falls, a tourist promenade Niagara Falls, Ontario, Canada
Clifton Hill, part of the suburb of Montpelier, Brighton, UK
Clifton Hill (album), a 2008 album by Canadian rock band Honeymoon Suite
Clifton Hill, U.S. Virgin Islands, town in the U.S.V.I.
Clifton Hills Station, a pastoral lease and cattle station in South Australia
Disappearance at Clifton Hill (a/k/a Clifton Hill), a Canadian thriller film